Ophiocordyceps nutans is an entomopathogenic fungus belonging to the order Hypocreales (Ascomycota) in the family Ophiocordycipitaceae. O. nutans only parasitizes Hemipterans, namely stinkbugs. In Korea, O. nutans is one of the most common species of Cordyceps. O. nutans, as well as other Cordyceps species, are mainly classified morphologically by their colour, fruit body shape, and host insect species. Stinkbugs cause considerable damage to agriculture and forestry, and the anamorph of O. nutans, Hymenostilbe nutans, is a potential selective biological control agent against the stinkbugs.

Distribution 
Ophiocordyceps nutans is found in the tropical forest regions of: Japan, Taiwan, China, New Guinea, and Korea, as well as other places.

References 

Insect diseases
Animal fungal diseases
Ophiocordycipitaceae
Fungi described in 1887